Dyschirius jedlickai is a species of ground beetle in the subfamily Scaritinae. It was described by Kult in 1940.

References

jedlickai
Beetles described in 1940